Mark D. McMillian (born April 29, 1970), nicknamed Mighty Mouse, is a former American football cornerback who played professionally in the National Football League (NFL) for eight seasons. He was drafted by the Philadelphia Eagles with the 272nd overall pick in the 10th round of the 1992 NFL Draft, where he spent four seasons. He also spent two seasons with the Kansas City Chiefs. In his career, McMillian had brief stints with the New Orleans Saints, San Francisco 49ers, and Washington Redskins.

McMillian attended Kennedy High School in Granada Hills, California, where he did not start playing organized football until his senior year. He played college football at the University of Alabama after transferring from Glendale Junior College. In 1991, while in college at Alabama, he returned an interception for a 98-yard touchdown versus Tennessee-Chattanooga, a school record.

In 1997, while playing for the Chiefs, he led the NFL in interception return yards and was tied for second-most interceptions with 8.

One of the smallest players in the NFL, McMillian stood 5 ft 7 in (1.70 m) and was listed at various points in his career as 162 lb (73 kg), 154 lb (70 kg), and 148 lb (67 kg). In October 1995, he won an Emmy Award for his regular segment of teammate Randall Cunningham's weekly pregame show. The segment, titled Little Big Men, showcased highlights from players standing 5 ft 9 in (1.75 m) or shorter.

Post-Football
McMillian appeared as a contestant on Season 2 of American culinary reality competition television series Next Level Chef, mentored by Gordon Ramsay. He finished in 15th place out of 18 contestants.

References

External links
 

Living people
1970 births
American football cornerbacks
Alabama Crimson Tide football players
Kansas City Chiefs players
New Orleans Saints players
Philadelphia Eagles players
San Francisco 49ers players
Washington Redskins players
Players of American football from Los Angeles